"The Man with All the Toys" is a Christmas song written by Brian Wilson and Mike Love for the American rock band The Beach Boys. It was released on their 1964 album The Beach Boys' Christmas Album. As a single that year it had limited success (No. 6 on the Billboard Christmas chart), but built sales over successive Christmases and is listed by Billboard in the Top 100 selling Christmas songs in history, though well below the Beach Boys' 1963 Christmas single "Little Saint Nick".

A French-language version of this song was recorded in 1968 by Canadian singer Renée Martel, under the title "As-tu vu le Père Noël?".

Wilson re-recorded this song for his 2005 Christmas album, What I Really Want for Christmas.

D-TV Disney set the song to the two Silly Symphonies, Santa's Workshop and The Night Before Christmas.

Personnel
Brian Wilson – lead vocals, piano, bass guitar
Mike Love – lead vocals
Carl Wilson – lead guitar, harmony vocals
Al Jardine – rhythm guitar, harmony vocals
Dennis Wilson – drums, harmony vocals

References

Songs about Santa Claus
1964 songs
American Christmas songs
The Beach Boys songs
Christmas novelty songs
Songs written by Brian Wilson
Songs written by Mike Love
Song recordings produced by Brian Wilson
1964 singles
Capitol Records singles